Võsu is an Estonian surname. Notable people with the surname include:

Maarika Võsu (born 1972), Estonian fencer
Peeter Võsu (born 1958), Estonian politician

Estonian-language surnames